Dazhou, Sichuan gained notoriety for the corruption of Dazhu County (大竹)  officials that caused a mass protest in January 2007.  The incident involved a 16-year-old waitress in the KTV rooms of Laishide (莱仕德) Hotel.

Description 

Laishide (莱仕德) Hotel was a four-star hotel built with investment from local officials and local police, and the sentiment against the hotel among the local populace existed long before the mass protest in January 2007 because of illegal and corrupt activities behind the closed doors of the hotel.

Miss Yang Daili (杨代莉), a 16-year-old young girl working at the hotel's karaoke rooms (KTV) was famed for her beauty and height, 1.70 meters.  On December 29, 2006, three high-ranking provincial officials went to the Laishide Hotel and asked Miss Yang Daili to have dinner with them, and took her out the same night.  The next morning, Miss Yang Daili was found dead in a suite at the hotel.  According to the police report, Miss Yang was drugged and raped, and she suffered brutal torture, including her tongue being cut, teeth broken due to beating, nipples cut off, and privates mutilated.

Miss Yang Daili's family started a protest outside the hotel on January 12, 2007. After they received no explanation from the hotel despite repeated requests, sympathizers and those who resented corruption gathered around the family to show their support. Their number first increased by the dozens daily, then by the hundreds, and eventually by the thousands. The attempt of Laishide Hotel to settle down before catching the real killer only increased public outrage even further, because previously, two waitresses and a security guard working at the hotel had been killed and no suspects had been found.  The official local governmental news website, however, failed to mention anything on these three previous murders and it once again attempted do the same for the most recent murder.

By the afternoon of January 17, 2007, more than ten thousand protesters had gathered outside the hotel, and as the news of Laishide Hotel offering Miss Yang Daili's family half a million Renminbi to settle before the killers were found, and rejection of the offer by  family members reached the crowd, the people finally had had enough.  Angry protesters rushed into the hotel, damaged everything inside, and eventually set fire to the hotel. The fire was not put out until five hours later.

As the number of protesters and public outrage increased, the local government could no longer keep the murder a secret and was forced to release the police findings on January 18, 2007.  However, the official local government's news release only publicized the police report of the crime scene, and attempted to blame the crime on a male hotel employee named Liu (劉).  The action was unanimously viewed by the local populace as an attempt to cover up the involvement of three high-ranking governmental officials of provincial level. Government officials were involved in all of the previous three murders that had been kept secret by the local government but were forced into the open due to the most recent event. The enraged protesters continued to gather after the fire was put out and clashed with riot police who were sent in.

External links 
 Dazhu(大竹) Government Website
 Hotel Worker's Murder at Work Leads to Thousands-Strong Protest Signaling Deep Discontent with Widespread Corruption and Impunity in China
 The Mass Incident in Dazhu County

Riots and civil disorder in China
History of Sichuan
2007 in China
2007 riots
2007 protests